According to the Book of Mormon, Chemish  was a Nephite record keeper.  He received the Book of Mormon record from his brother Amaron, and penned a single verse in the Book of Omni (Omni 1:9) before passing the record to his son Abinadom:

9 Now I, Chemish, write what few things I write, in the same book with my brother; for behold, I saw the last which he wrote, that he wrote it with his own hand; and he wrote it in the day that he delivered them unto me. And after this manner we keep the records, for it is according to the commandments of our fathers. And I make an end.

Possible origin of the name 
Hugh Nibley relates the name to his position within the family or the succession, as the fifth in line (Hebrew חמש means "five") and states:

"Now that's an obvious word. 'Chemish' is the same as the Latin 'Quintus'. It means the 'fifth', either the fifth son, or the fifth in the line of succession. Is he fifth? He looks more like sixth. If you have Jacob, Enos, Jarom, Omni and Amaron, that would make him the sixth. Unless it is after Jacob; who knows? Anyway it is a perfectly good Semitic name which means 'the fifth'. It's a common proper name too. There's the town of Chemish..."

References

Book of Mormon people